This is list details of Hertha BSC coaches and their statistics, trophies and other records.

Tenure, wins, draws, losses and winning percentage

Combined records

Trophies won

References

Managers
 
Lists of football managers by club in Germany